Kemnay is a small community in Manitoba, Canada. It is located in the Rural Municipality of Whitehead about 10 kilometres west of Brandon on PTH 1A. Kemnay has the same name as Kemnay, a village in Scotland.

In October 2001, most of the community was evacuated when a train carrying methanol and vinyl acetate derailed near Kemnay.

External links 
 Transportation Safety Board of Canada: Railway Investigation Report

References

Unincorporated communities in Westman Region